Santa Coloma may refer to:

 Gaspar de Santa Coloma (1742–1815), Spanish/Argentine businessman
 Santa Coloma d'Andorra, village in Andorra
 Church of Santa Coloma d'Andorra, in the village
 FC Santa Coloma, football club in the village
 UE Santa Coloma, football club in the village
 Santa Coloma, Asturias, village in Asturias, Spain
 Santa Coloma de Gramenet, city in Barcelonès, Catalonia
 Santa Coloma (Barcelona Metro), a railway station
 Santa Coloma de Queralt, town in Conca de Barberà, Catalonia
 Santa Coloma de Farners, town in Selva, Catalonia
 Santa Coloma, La Rioja, village in La Rioja, Spain
 Santa Coloma de Cervelló, town in Baix Llobregat, Catalonia

See also
 Saint Columba (disambiguation)
 St Columb (disambiguation)